Blazed Alder Creek is a tributary, about  long, of the Bull Run River in the U.S. state of Oregon. Part of the system that provides drinking water to the city of Portland, it flows generally north through a protected part of the Mount Hood National Forest in Clackamas and Multnomah counties. The creek is named after a  blazed (marked) alder tree that was used as a benchmark during early watershed surveys.

Course
Formed by the confluence of Bedrock Creek and Hickman Creek in Clackamas County, Blazed Alder Creek begins slightly north of Blazed Alder Butte and flows through the Mount Hood National Forest to meet the Bull Run River in Multnomah County. The creek lies entirely within the Bull Run Watershed Management Unit, a restricted area meant to protect the water supply for the city of Portland. Flowing north from its source in the western foothills of the Cascade Range, the creek passes a United States Geological Survey (USGS) stream gauge before receiving Nanny Creek from the left just before leaving Clackamas County and entering Multnomah County. Further downstream, it receives an unnamed tributary from the left before entering the Bull Run River.

Discharge
Since 1963, the USGS has monitored the flow of Blazed Alder Creek at a stream gauge  from the mouth and only  from the source. It occurred during the floods of December 1964 and January 1965, rated by the National Weather Service as one of Oregon's top 10 weather events of the 20th century.

Watershed
The Bull Run River watershed, which includes Blazed Alder Creek, drains . Most of the watershed, including all of the Blazed Alder Creek basin, is restricted to uses related to water collection, storage, treatment, and forest management. The Portland Water Bureau and the United States Forest Service manage the watershed.

See also
List of rivers of Oregon
Bull Run National Forest

References

Works cited
McArthur, Lewis A., and McArthur, Lewis L. (2003) [1928]. Oregon Geographic Names, 4th edition. Portland: Oregon Historical Society Press. .
Portland Water Bureau (2007). "Landscape Conditions", Chapter 4 of Current Habitat Conditions in the  Habitat Conservation Plan Area. Portland, Oregon: Portland Water Bureau. Retrieved March 9, 2010.

External links
Sandy River Basin Watershed Council
Sandy River Basin Partners
Forest Service, Mount Hood National Forest

Rivers of Oregon
Rivers of Multnomah County, Oregon
Rivers of Clackamas County, Oregon